Legislative elections were held in Mexico on 15 August 1943. The Party of the Mexican Revolution won all 147 seats in the Chamber of Deputies.

Results

References

Mexico
Legislative
Legislative elections in Mexico
August 1943 events
Election and referendum articles with incomplete results